Costa del Este is a Panamanian football club based in Panama City, that currently plays in Liga Panameña de Fútbol. It takes its name from the real estate development in the township of Juan Díaz, Panama City.

History 
Since its inception in 2008 and until 2014, the club was based in La Chorrera and known as Santos FC.
Under new ownership the team had a perfect season winning the 2017-18 Liga Nacional de Ascenso Apertura and Clausura tournaments and gaining direct promotion to Liga Panameña de Fútbol.
The winning streak continued during the 2018-19 Liga Panameña de Fútbol Apertura tournament reaching to the title game against Tauro FC losing the match 1–2.

Honors 
Liga Panameña de Fútbol: 1 appearance
2018-19 : Apertura Runner Up
Liga Nacional de Ascenso: 5 appearances
2017-18 : Winners - Promoted
Copa Rommel Fernández: 1 appearance
2012 : Winners - Promoted (as Santos FC)

Kit history

Jersey Suppliers

Players

Current squad

Non-playing staff

Board of directors

Management hierarchy

Historical list of coaches 

 Edwin Oropeza (2014–16)
 Francisco Perlo (2016–17)
 Ángel Sanchez (2017– December 2018)
 Carlos Perez Porras (2019-19) 2 matches
 Juan Carlos Fuentes/Francisco Portillo/Juan Walker (2019–19)

 Juan Vita ( - December 2019)
 Julio Infante (January 2020 - December 2020)
   Felipe Borowsky (January 2021 - May 2021)
 Daniel Blanco (May 2021 -)

References 

 
Football clubs in Panama
Association football clubs established in 2008
Sport in Panama City
2008 establishments in Panama